Mount Fox may refer to:

 Mount Fox (Antarctica)
 Mount Fox (Selkirk Mountains) in British Columbia, Canada
 Mount Fox (Canadian Rockies), a mountain on the Alberta/British Columbia border, Canada 
 Mount Fox (Montana) in Montana, USA
 Mount Fox (New Zealand) in South Island, New Zealand 
 Mount Fox (Queensland) in Queensland, Australia